Stuart Glacier lies to the north of Mount Stuart, in the U.S. state of Washington. Stuart Glacier is within the Alpine Lakes Wilderness of Wenatchee National Forest.

See also
List of glaciers in the United States

References

Glaciers of the North Cascades
Glaciers of Chelan County, Washington
Glaciers of Washington (state)